Louisa Tempe Udny became Louisa Tempe Mallet (15 April 1837 – 2 July 1904) was a British activist for women's education.

Life
Mallet was born in 1837 in Kolkata in India. Her parents were Frances (born Hannay) and Scottish-born Bengal civil servant George Udny. She married Charles Mallet in 1859 and in 1862 they had a son who in time would be Sir Charles Edward Mallet M.P.

In the 1870s the Women's Education Union (WEU) was active striving to create educational opportunities for girls with academic ambitions. The WEU was not only trying to increase the number of secondary schools for girls but also trying to raise the ambitions of the schools that did exist. The WEU's leading figures were two sisters Emily Shirreff and Maria Grey. From 1876 to 1881 Mallet was on the WEU central committee. In 1980 she also became involved in the management of Lisson Grove elementary schools in Marylebone working with Alice Westlake.

In November 1888 the Society for Promoting the Return of Women as County Councillors was formed by twelve women at Sarah Amos's house. The group included Elizabeth Lidgett and her sister Mary Bunting and it was led by Annie Leigh Browne. It was deciding suitable women candidates for election.

Mallet, Annie Leigh Browne, Eva McLaren, the Marchioness of Aberdeen and Millicent Garret Fawcett were key members. In 1891 she stood unsuccessfully for the Lambeth school board. She lost bu only a small amount in an election where Emma Maitland lost her seat. In 1893 the society changed its name to Women's Local Government Society (WLGS), reflecting its wish to encourage women to be involved in politics and not exclusively in county councils. Mallet was at the International Congress of Women in 1899 and she served on the WLGS executive committee until 1901.

Mallet died in 1904 in Bournemouth.

References

1837 births
1904 deaths
People from Kolkata
International Congress of Women people
British women activists